G. Marius Clore MAE, FRSC, FRS is a British-born, Anglo-American molecular biophysicist and structural biologist. He was born in London, U.K. and is a dual U.S./U.K. Citizen.  He is a Member of the National Academy of Sciences, a Fellow of the Royal Society, a NIH Distinguished Investigator, and the Chief of the Molecular and Structural Biophysics Section in the Laboratory of Chemical Physics of the National Institute of Diabetes and Digestive and Kidney Diseases at the U.S. National Institutes of Health.  He is known for his foundational work in three-dimensional protein and nucleic acid structure determination by biomolecular NMR spectroscopy, for advancing experimental approaches to the study of large macromolecules and their complexes by NMR, and for developing NMR-based methods to study rare conformational states in protein-nucleic acid and protein-protein recognition. Clore's discovery of previously undetectable, functionally significant, rare transient states of macromolecules has yielded fundamental new insights into the mechanisms of important biological processes, and in particular the significance of weak interactions and the mechanisms whereby the opposing constraints of speed and specificity are optimized. Further, Clore's work opens up a new era of pharmacology and drug design as it is now possible to target structures and conformations that have been heretofore unseen.

Biography
Clore received his undergraduate degree with first class honours in biochemistry from University College London in 1976 and medical degree from UCL Medical School  in 1979. After completing house physician and house surgeon appointments at University College Hospital and St Charles' Hospital (part of the St. Mary's Hospital group), respectively, he was a member of the scientific staff of the Medical Research Council National Institute for Medical Research from 1980 to 1984. He received his PhD from the National Institute for Medical Research in Physical Biochemistry in 1982. He was awarded a joint Lister Institute Research Fellowship from the Lister Institute of Preventive Medicine which he held from 1982 to 1984 at the Medical Research Council. In 1984 he joined the Max Planck Institute for Biochemistry in Martinsried, Germany, where he headed the Biological NMR department from 1984 to 1988.

In 1988, Clore was recruited to the National Institutes of Health (NIH) Laboratory of Chemical Physics (National Institute of Diabetes and Digestive and Kidney Diseases) located in Bethesda, Maryland, U.S., where he interacted closely in the late 1980s and early 1990s with NIH colleagues Ad Bax, Angela Gronenborn and Dennis Torchia on the development of multidimensional heteronuclear NMR spectroscopy and a structural biology effort aimed at proteins involved in the pathogenesis of HIV/AIDS.  He has remained at the NIH ever since and is currently a NIH Distinguished Investigator and Chief of the Section on Molecular and Structural Biophysics at the NIH. He is an elected Member of the United States National Academy of Sciences, a Fellow of the Royal Society, a Fellow of the American Academy of Arts and Sciences, and a Foreign Member of the Academia Europaea (Biochemistry and Molecular Biology Section). Clore's citation upon election to the Royal Society reads:

Research

3D structure determination in solution by NMR
Clore played a pivotal role in the development of three- and four-dimensional NMR spectroscopy, the use of residual dipolar couplings for structure determination, the development of simulated annealing and restrained molecular dynamics for three-dimensional protein and nucleic acid structure determination, the solution NMR structure determination of large protein complexes, the development of the combined use of NMR and small-angle X-ray scattering in solution structure determination, and the analysis and characterization of protein dynamics by NMR. Clore's work on complexes of all the cytoplasmic components of the bacterial phosphotransferase system (PTS) led to significant insights into how signal transduction proteins recognize multiple, structurally dissimilar partners by generating similar binding surfaces from completely different structural elements and exploiting side chain conformational plasticity. Clore is also one of the main authors of the very widely used XPLOR-NIH NMR structure determination program

Detection and visualization of excited and sparsely-populated states 
Clore's recent work has focused on developing new NMR methods (such as paramagnetic relaxation enhancement, dark state exchange saturation transfer spectroscopy and lifetime line broadening) to detect, characterize and visualize the structure and dynamics of sparsely-populated states of macromolecules, which are important in macromolecular interactions but invisible to conventional structural and biophysical techniques. Examples of include the direct demonstration of rotation-coupled sliding and intermolecular translocation as mechanisms whereby sequence-specific DNA binding proteins locate their target site(s) within an overwhelming sea of non-specific DNA sequences; the detection, visualization and characterization of encounter complexes in protein-protein association; the analysis of the synergistic effects of conformational selection and induced fit in protein-ligand interactions; and the uncovering of "dark", spectroscopically invisible states in interactions of NMR-visible proteins and polypeptides (including intrinsically disordered states) with very large megadalton macromolecular assemblies. The latter includes an atomic-resolution view of the dynamics of the amyloid-β aggregation process. and the demonstration of intrinsic unfoldase/foldase activity of the macromolecular machine GroEL. These various techniques have also been used to uncover the kinetic pathway of pre-nucleation transient oligomerization events and associated structures involving the protein encoded by huntingtin exon-1, which may provide a potential avenue for therapeutic intervention in Huntington's disease, a fatal autosomal dominant, neurodegenerative condition.

Scientific impact
Clore is one of the most highly cited scientists in the fields of molecular biophysics, structural biology, biomolecular NMR and chemistry with over 540 published scientific articles and an h-index (number of papers cited h or more time) of 142. Clore is also one of only four NIH scientists to have been elected to both the United States National Academy of Sciences and The Royal Society, the other three being Julius Axelrod, Francis Collins and Harold Varmus.

Personal life
Marius Clore was educated at the Lycee Francais Charles de Gaulle in Kensington, London. Marius Clore's father was the film producer Leon Clore whose credits include The French Lieutenant's Woman, and his mother was Miriam Clore (née Werner), a member of the Haganah during the 1948 Arab-Israeli War and subsequently the personal assistant to David Ben Gurion prior to moving to England. Sir Charles Clore and Dame Vivien Duffield are his great uncle and second cousin, respectively. He is married to Carole A. Bewley a senior investigator and Chief of the Laboratory of Bioorganic Chemistry in the National Institute of Diabetes and Digestive and Kidney Diseases at the National Institutes of Health.

Awards and honors
2021: Murray Goodman Memorial Prize 
2021: Honorary Doctorate of Science (DSc) from University College London
2021: Royal Society of Chemistry Khorana Prize 
2020: Elected Fellow of the Royal Society
2020: Biophysical Society Innovation Award
2015: Elected Foreign Member of the Academia Europaea.
2014: Elected Member of the United States National Academy of Sciences (Biophysics and Computational Biology section)
2012: Biochemical Society 2013 Centenary Award (previously known as the Jubilee Medal) and Sir Frederick Gowland Hopkins Memorial Lecture (U.K.)
2011: Royal Society of Chemistry Centenary Prize 
2011: Elected Fellow of the International Society of Magnetic Resonance
2010: Elected Fellow of the American Academy of Arts and Sciences
2010: Hillebrand Award of the Washington Chemical Society
2009: Elected Fellow of the Biophysical Society
2003: Elected Member of the Lister Institute of Preventive Medicine (U.K.)
2001: Original member, Institute for Scientific Information (ISI) Highly Cited Researchers Database (in Biology & Biochemistry and Chemistry sections).
1999: Elected Fellow of the American Association for the Advancement of Science.
1993: Dupont-Merck Young Investigator Award of the Protein Society
1990: Elected Fellow of the Royal Society of Chemistry (FRSC) (U.K).

References

External links
G. Marius Clore laboratory homepage
Oral history interview transcript with Marius Clore on 23 March 2020, American Institute of Physics, Niels Bohr Library & Archives
Listing on the United States National Academy of Sciences web site
Listing on the Royal Society web site
Listing on the American Academy of Arts and Sciences web site
Listing on the Academia Europaea web site
 Listing on NIDDK/NIH web site
Listing on NIH Intramural Research Program web site

G. Marius Clore Orcid ID
Marius Clore on Landmark Article in the Journal of Magnetic Resonance
Marius Clore Lecture on "Transient Prenucleation Oligomerization of Huntingtin" at the ICMRBS Webinar on Emerging Topics in Biomolecular Resonance (4/15/2021)
List of University College London Honorary Graduates

Fellows of the Royal Society
Members of the United States National Academy of Sciences
Fellows of the American Academy of Arts and Sciences
Members of Academia Europaea
Fellows of the Royal Society of Chemistry
Fellows of the American Association for the Advancement of Science
American scientists
British scientists
American biophysicists
British biophysicists
English biophysicists
American biochemists
British biochemists
English biochemists
20th-century British medical doctors
21st-century British medical doctors
Biochemists
Computational chemists
Nuclear magnetic resonance
National Institutes of Health people
National Institutes of Health faculty
Alumni of University College London
Alumni of the UCL Medical School
Alumni of the University of London
1955 births
Living people
British emigrants to the United States